Police ranks are a system of hierarchical relationships in police organizations. The rank system defines authority and responsibility in a police organization, and affects the culture within the police force. Police ranks, dependent on country, are similar to military ranks in function and design due to policing in many countries developing from military organizations and operations, such as in western Europe, former Soviet countries, and English-speaking countries. Usually, uniforms denote the bearer's rank by particular insignia affixed to the uniforms.

Rank is not only used to designate leadership, but to establish pay-grade as well. As rank increases, pay-grade follows, but so does the amount of responsibility.

Albania

Algeria

Andorra

Antigua and Barbuda

Argentina

Argentine Federal Police
Officers

Others

Buenos Aires Provincial Police

Armenia

Officers

Enlisted

Australia

Example

Austria
Commissioners

Leading officers

Supervising officers and police officers

Azerbaijan
Officers

Enlisted

Bangladesh
Superior officers

Subordinate officers

Belarus
Officers

Other

Belgium

Bermuda

Bolivia
Officers

Others

Bosnia and Herzegovina

Republika Srpska

Bosnia and Herzegovina

Brazil
Brazil has several different police forces, each with its own ranks. At a federal level, there are the Federal Police (the equivalent to the FBI), the Federal Highway Police and the Federal Railroad Police. At a state level, there are the military police (a gendarmerie type force unlike the military police of many other countries, the Brazilian equivalent of which is the army police) and the civil police. At city level, there is the Municipal Guards.

Civil police
The Brazilian Civil Police rank follows, from higher to lower, as:
 Comissário/Delegado (Commissioner/Delegate)
 Escrivão (Clerk)
 Agente/Investigador/Inspetor/Especialista (Agent/Investigator/Inspector/Specialist)
 Perito criminal (Forensics expert)

Military police
The following details the ranks of the military police, which are also used by the National Public Security Force.

The ranks are valid for the state military police agencies (such as the Military Police of Minas Gerais, São Paulo, and Rio de Janeiro) and are listed, respectively, from higher to lower ranks:
Officers

Others

Brunei
Gazetted officers

Non gazetted officers

Bulgaria
Officers

Others

Canada

While some smaller or area specific police forces (ports, docks, tunnels etc.) may use variations on, or fewer of, these ranks, most territorial police forces and special police forces have a standard set of operational ranks based on either of the two systems shown here:

Royal Canadian Mounted Police 

Officers

Others

Sûreté du Québec

Chad

Officers

Enlisted

Chile
These are the ranks used by Chilean police services.

Investigations Police of Chile (PDI)
Officers
 
 
 
 
 
 
 
 
 
 
 

Since 2017 this agency has rank insignia.

Carabineros de Chile
Officers

Non-commissioned officers and enlisted

China

People's Police
Chinese police officers under the Ministry of Public Security use rank insignia on both side of shoulders on the duty uniform. Senior officers ranking at commissioner and superintendent levels wear these on the white collar uniforms, and for inspector level and below, officers wear them on the sky blue collar uniforms.

Officers

Others

People's Armed Police
The People's Armed Police, as part of the People's Liberation Army, uses the same ranks and uniform as the PLA itself, while the China Maritime Safety Administration uses a different system.

Officers

Non-commissioned officers and men

Units of the China Coast Guard wear identical insignia as a part of the PAP.

Colombia

Officers

Non-commissioned officers and enlisted

Croatia

Regular police ranks

Cyprus

Czech Republic
Officers

Others

Denmark

Estonia
Officers

Others

Egypt
Officers

Others

Ethiopia
The rank structure of the Ethiopian Federal Police is as follows:
 Commissioner general
 Deputy commissioner general
 Commissioner
 Deputy commissioner
 Assistant commissioner
 Commander
 Deputy commander
 Chief inspector
 Inspector
 Deputy inspector
 Assistant inspector
 Chief sergeant
 Sergeant
 Deputy sergeant
 Assistant sergeant
 Constable

Fiji

Finland

France



Officers

Non-commissioned offices and Volunteer assistant gendarmes

Germany

Higher Police Service

Elevated Police Service

Middle Police Service

Police support employees

Greece
Officers

NCO and enlisted

Guatemala

Hong Kong

Gazetted
 Commissioner of police (CP): crest over pip over wreathed and crossed batons
 Deputy commissioner of police (DCP): crest over wreathed and crossed batons
 Senior assistant commissioner of police (SACP): pip over wreathed and crossed batons
 Assistant commissioner of police (ACP): wreathed and crossed batons
 Chief superintendent of police (CSP): crest over two pips
 Senior superintendent of police (SSP): crest over pip
 Superintendent of police (SP): crest

Inspectorate
 Chief inspector of police (CIP): three pips
 Senior inspector of police (SIP): two pips over bar
 Inspector of police (IP): two pips
 Probationary inspector of police (PI): pip

Junior police officers (JPOs)
Non-commissioned officers (NCOs)
 Station sergeant (SSGT): wreathed crest
 Sergeant (SGT): three downward-pointing chevrons

Rank and file
 Senior constable (SPC): downward-pointing chevron
 Police constable (PC): slide with ID number

Hungary
Officers

Others

Iceland

Source:

India

Gazetted officers
Gazetted officers include all the Indian Police Service officers and all state police services officers of and above the rank of assistant superintendent of police (ASP) or deputy superintendent of police (Dy.SP) in the Indian Police Service and State Police Service forces respectively.

Non-gazetted officers

Indonesia

Officers 

Others

Iran
Officers

Others

Iraq

The Iraqi Police is made up of three branches, under the command of the Iraqi Ministry of Interior, these being the Iraqi Police Service which tasked with general patrol of Iraq's cities, the Federal Police (earlier was called National Police) which are a paramilitary organisation which deals with incidents that are beyond the control of the Iraqi Police, but are not so serious the Iraqi Army are involved, and the supporting force that is made up of the Department of Border Enforcement.

Iraqi Police officers ranks are the same that of Iraqi army ordered lowest to highest with symbol on epaulette:

Officers

Enlisted

Republic of Ireland

Israel
Officers

Others

Italy

Polizia di Stato

Carabinieri
Officers

Others

Japan

Kenya

The Kenya Police wear badges of rank on the shoulders (inspector-general – inspector) and sleeve (senior sergeant – constable) of their uniform to denote their rank. In line with the ongoing reforms, the uniforms committee is also working on new insignia for the revised rank structure, which will have to be approved by the National Police Service Commission. The order of Kenya Police ranks is as follows:
 Inspector-general (formerly commissioner of police)
 Deputy inspector-general
 Senior assistant inspector-general
 Assistant inspector-general
 Senior superintendent
 Superintendent
 Assistant superintendent
 Chief inspector
 Inspector
 Senior sergeant
 Sergeant
 Constable

South Korea

Ranks:

 Police officer
 Newly commissioned officers are appointed as policeman assistant for a one year probationary period. The uniform and insignia of an assistant are identical to those of a policeman.
 Auxiliary policeman
 Sergeant constable (수경, 首警)
 Corporal constable (상경, 上警)
 Private constable first class (일경, 一警)
 Private constable (이경, 二警)

Laos
Officers

Enlisted

Latvia
The rank system of the Latvian State Police is as follows:

Lesotho

Lithuania
Officers

Other

Luxembourg
The Grand Ducal Police of Luxembourg has the following ranks (from top to bottom):

Macau
The Public Security Police Force of Macau (CPSP) includes the following categories, ranks and respective main functions :
 Senior ranks
 Superintendent general: commander of the CPSP
 Superintendent: deputy commander of the CPSP
 Intendent: commanding officer of level I units
 Sub-Intendent: commanding officer of level II units
 Commissioner: commanding officer of level III units
 Sub-commissioner: commanding officer of level IV units
 Chief: commanding officer of level V units
 Sub-chief: coordinator of complex tasks
 Basic ranks
 Principal constable: coordinator of simple tasks
 Constable first class: executor of operational, technical or administrative tasks
 Constable: executor of operational, technical or administrative tasks

North Macedonia

Malaysia
Gazetted officers

Non-gazetted officers

Maldives

Malta

Mexico
According to the General Law for the National System for Public Security, the federal, state and municipal police forces are mandated to have the same hierarchical organization. In addition, the national guard uses its own rank system.

National guard 
The national guard was formed by absorbing units and officers from the federal police, military police, and naval police.

Commissioned officers

Basic scale ladder

Yucatán State Police

Montenegro
Officers

Other

Myanmar
Commissioned officers

Enlisted ranks

Namibia

Netherlands

National police corps

Royal Marechaussee
Officers

Others

New Zealand

Nicaragua
Officers

Others

Norway

Pakistan
The following ranks are observed in the various police organizations across Pakistan (lowest to highest ranks)

Enlisted:
 Constable
 Head constable (HC)
 Assistant sub-inspector (ASI)
 Sub-inspector (SI)
 Inspector (INSP)

Commissioned officers:
 Deputy superintendent of police (DSP)/ Assistant superintendent of police (ASP) OF 2
 Superintendent of police (SP) OF 3
 Superintendent of police (with 8 year service) (SP) OF 4
 Senior superintendent of police/Assistant inspector general of police (SSP/AIG) OF 5
 Deputy inspector general of police (DIG) one star OF 6
 Additional inspector general of police (Addl IG) two star OF 7
 Inspector general of police (IGP) three star OF 8
 Director general National Police Bureau (DG NPB) three star OF 8
 Director general Federal Investigation Agency (DG FIA) three star OF 8
 Director general Intelligence Bureau (DG IB) four star OF 9

Panama

Commissioned officer ranks

Other ranks

Paraguay

Officers

Others

Peru

Philippines

Officers

Others

Poland

Polish State Police
Officers

Other

Portugal
The public security police (PSP) of Portugal includes the following categories, ranks, insignia and respective main functions:
 Officers
  Chief superintendent: national director of the PSP,
  Chief superintendent: deputy national director or inspector general of the PSP
  Chief superintendent: commanding officer of a metropolitan or regional command
  Superintendent: commanding officer of a district command or second-in-command of a metropolitan or regional command
  Intendent: division commander in a metropolitan or regional command or second-in-command of a district command
  Sub-intendent: division commander in a district command or second-in-command of a division commanded by an intendent
  Commissioner: second-in-command of a division commanded by a sub-intendent
  Sub-commissioner: commanding officer of a police squad (police station)
 Chiefs
  Principal chief: auxiliary of a unit commanding officer
  Chief: supervisor of staff and leader of police teams
 Agents
  Principal agent: a senior principal agent who may perform the same functions as a chief, others perform the same functions as an agent
  Agent: functions of police constable
 ISCPSI students:
  Officer candidate: student of the fifth year of the training course for police officers (CFOP)
  Cadet: student of the fourth year of the CFOP
  Cadet: student of the third year of the CFOP
  Cadet: student of the second year of the CFOP
  Cadet: student of the first year of the CFOP

National Republican Guard
Officers

Others

Romania

Romanian Police

Police officers' corps

Police agents' corps

Romanian Gendarmerie
Commissioned officers

Others

Russia

Police of Russia
Officers

Other ranks

Main Directorate for Criminal Investigation of the Ministry of the Interior
Ministry of Interior criminal investigators have jurisdiction over cases concerning harm to health, crimes against property, economic crimes, drug trafficking, banditry and other such cases.

Officers

Enlisted

Investigative Committee of Russia
The Investigative Committee of Russia has jurisdiction over cases concerning murder, rape, kidnapping, encroachment on the life of a law enforcement officer and other such cases.

Federal Security Service
The Federal Security Service has jurisdiction over cases of treason, espionage, terrorism, hostage-taking and other crimes against national security.

Officers

Enlisted

San Marino

Saudi Arabia
Officers
</noinclude>

Enlisted
</noinclude>

Senegal

Officers

Enlisted

Serbia

 Police General
 Police Colonel
 Police Lieutenant Colonel
 Police Major
 Police Captain
 Police Lieutenant
 Police Second Lieutenant
 Officer cadet
 Chief Warrant Officer
 Warrant Officer Class 1
 Warrant Officer Class 2
 Sergeant Major
 Sergeant First class
 Staff Sergeant
 Police Sergeant
 Constable 1st class
 Constable
 Constable candidate

Singapore
Below shown are the rank structure of the Singapore Police Force.
Latest changes made to the ranks of the SPF were made in 2016. Officers with ranks that were made obsolete would continue to carry their ranks until their next promotion.

Officers

Others

Slovenia

Somaliland

Officers

Enlisted

South Africa
Officers

Other

Spain

Cuerpo Nacional de Policía

Guardia civil – Civil guard

Sri Lanka

Gazetted officers

Non-gazetted officers

Sweden

Switzerland

Municipal police corps in the Canton of Zürich

Taiwan
National Police Agency

 Republic of China Military Police

Tanzania
Gazetted officers

Non gazetted officers

Thailand

Commissioned officers

Other

Turkey

Officers

Other ranks

Ukraine
The ranks used by the National Guard of Ukraine are the same as the ones used by the Armed Forces of Ukraine.

Officers

Junior officers

United Arab Emirates

Abu Dhabi

United Kingdom

United States

The United States law enforcement ranking model is generally quasi-military in structure. Each level of law enforcement (federal, state, and local) has its own rank structure and insignia, and these vary considerably from agency to agency. There is no nationally set law enforcement rank and insignia structure but they tend to follow similar patterns. Because of that, this is not an exhaustive list. Some departments, particularly small ones, have very few ranks, while large ones have ranks as extensive as United States military rank structures.

Federal
The U.S. Department of Justice and the U.S. Department of Homeland Security (DHS) contain multiple law enforcement agencies and are the largest federal departments responsible for law enforcement; however, other governmental departments and agencies have law enforcement bodies. Each federal law enforcement agency has a unique rank structure. Many federal law enforcement agencies rank structures resemble military rank structure but have different cogitations regarding responsibilities and duties. In general, all law enforcement groups in United States follow a similar pattern: director/chief, assistant/deputy director/chief, special agent in charge, assistant special agent in charge, supervisory special agent, special agent.
Example
United States Border Patrol

State
State law enforcement agencies often have a pronounced paramilitary rank structure with rank titles such as: colonel, lieutenant colonel, major, captain, lieutenant, staff sergeant, sergeant, corporal, trooper.

Example
Alabama Highway Patrol and Alabama Department of Public Safety

County
County sheriffs are usually elected, chiefs of county police departments are appointed. In a sheriff's department common ranks are undersheriff, assistant sheriff (large departments), senior deputy sheriff, and deputy sheriff, while in a county police department paramilitary titles may be used, which also are to be found in large sheriff's departments.

Example of a sheriff's department
Santa Clara County, California

Example of a county police department
Anne Arundel County, Maryland

Municipal/city
Municipal or city police departments can use paramilitary ranks or more distinct police ranks, or a combination of both. Commissioners or chiefs are normally heading the departments, aided by commanders and inspectors or colonels or majors. Captain, lieutenant and sergeant are standard ranks. Below them are corporals, detectives, police officers.

Example of a city police department
Aurora Police Department, Colorado

Uruguay

National Police of Uruguay

Vanuatu

Commissioned officers

Non-commissioned personnel

Vatican City State
Officers

Others

Venezuela

Vietnam
Students and officers

NCOs and enlisted

Zimbabwe
Commissioned officers

Non-commissioned officers

See also
 Military rank
 United States law enforcement decorations
 Fire department ranks by country
 Ranks of Gendarmeries

Notes

References